Girardi may refer to:

Animals
 Agyneta girardi, a species of sheet weaver found in Canada and the United States
 Cerodrillia girardi, a species of sea snail, a marine gastropod mollusk in the family Drilliidae
 Masticophis taeniatus girardi, a subspecies of the striped whipsnake
 Philothamnus girardi, a species of snake in the family Colubridae
 Plasmodium girardi, a malaria parasite affecting lemurs
 Suchosaurus girardi, a species of spinosaurid dinosaur in the Suchosaurus genus

Fish
 Arkansas River shiner (Notropis girardi), a species of ray-finned fish in the genus Notropis
 Labeobarbus girardi, a species of ray-finned fish in the genus Labeobarbus
 Potomac sculpin (Cottus girardi), a freshwater species of sculpin

Insects
 Ancylonotopsis girardi, a species of beetle in the family Cerambycidae
 Buckleria girardi, a moth of the family Pterophoridae
 Chrysomantis girardi, a species of praying mantis found in Côte d'Ivoire and Guinea
 Clivina girardi, a species of ground beetle in the subfamily Scaritinae
 Dyschirius girardi, a species of ground beetle in the subfamily Scaritinae
 Eunidia parastrigata girardi, a subspecies of the Eunidia parastrigata species of beetle in the family Cerambycidae
 Frea girardi, a species of beetle in the family Cerambycidae
 Inermoleiopus girardi, a species of beetle in the family Cerambycidae
 Polyptychus girardi, a moth of the family Sphingidae

People
 Agenor Girardi (1952–2018), Roman Catholic bishop
 Alexander Girardi (1850–1918), Austrian actor and tenor singer in operettas
 Daniel Girardi (born 1984), Canadian former professional ice hockey defenceman
 Guido Girardi (born 1961), Chilean doctor and politician
 Vienna Girardi (born ), winner of the 14th season of The Bachelor reality television series
 Wolfgang Girardi (1928–2018), Austrian gymnast
 Vesna Girardi-Jurkić (1944–2012), Croatian archeologist and museologist

Americans
 Frank Girardi (born 1939), former American football player and coach
 Joe Girardi (born 1964), American professional baseball former catcher and current manager
 Joe Girardi (American football) (1943–1982), American football coach
 Robert Girardi (born 1961), American author
 Thomas Girardi (born 1939), attorney and a founder with Robert Keese of Girardi & Keese
 Erika Jayne (named Erika Nay Girardi; born 1971), American singer, actress and television personality

Italians
 Domenico Girardi (born 1985), Italian professional football player
 Edoardo Girardi (born 1985), Italian former road cyclist
 Francesco Girardi (born 1966), Italian equestrian
 Graziano Girardi (born 1940), Italian Venetist politician
 Sergio Girardi (born 1946), Italian professional football player
 Ulrico Girardi (1930–1986), Italian bobsledder
 Walter Girardi (born 1976), former Italian Alpine skier

Other
 Girardi & Keese, a Los Angeles-based law firm
 Girardi, the surname of multiple characters from the American fantasy family drama television series Joan of Arcadia

See also
 Giraldi
 Girard (disambiguation)